Hoots & Hellmouth is an American band from Philadelphia, Pennsylvania, United States.

History
Hoots & Hellmouth was formed in 2005 by Sean Hoots and Andrew Gray. The formation of the band was partially a reaction to and a rebellion against the grandiose rock-star attitude of modern rock bands, with which they were previously involved. The group was initially started as a duo, playing roots music intended to evoke the revival feeling. They eventually expanded to four members after adding Pilot Round The Sun, guitarist, Rob Berliner and John Branigan. Most of the time, they play without a live drummer, instead stomping and using hand percussion such as tambourines. The group's self-titled debut appeared in 2007 on MAD Dragon Records, distributed by Warner. In early 2008, the album, Hoots & Hellmouth, won in The 7th Annual Independent Music Awards for Best College Record Label Album. Their follow-up album, The Holy Open Secret, arrived in 2009. On Friday, August 21, as part of their months-long CD release tour, the band headlined their second WXPN Free at Noon concert, playing an 8-song set. The show, which was videotaped for WHYY-TV's weekly On Canvas program, took place at World Cafe Live and was broadcast live via radio. On April 19, 2010 "The Window in the Woodshed" was unveiled on HootsandHellmouth.com. A video for unreleased new material titled "The Photograph is Still." In early November 2010 the band unveiled through their Facebook page, Kickstarter, and other media that they were no longer carried by a label. They had been working on new material for some time and still wished to release a new album. Their Kickstarter project, titled "It came from the woodshed!" was announced on November 5, 2010, with an initial goal of $6,000 to produce and record a 6-song EP. Eventually, when the pledged total reached the $10,000 mark on November 23, the band issued an update asking for fans to reach the $15,000 mark so a full LP could be produced.  By December 6, 2010, the campaign achieved $23,882 and was listed in Kickstarter's Hall of Fame, which lists 100 of the most successful Kickstarter campaigns since the company's inception in 2009. The album is presumably set to be recorded in February, 2011, while they are on tour in Ann Arbor, Michigan, which is where the band has studio time booked.

Members
Sean Hoots - guitar, vocals
Rob Berliner - mandolin, banjo, piano, organ, vocals
Todd "Bud" Erk - upright and electric bass, vocals
Mike Reilly - drums, vocals

Discography
Hoots & Hellmouth (MAD Dragon Records, 2007)
The Holy Open Secret (MAD Dragon Records, 2009)
Face First In The Dirt (2011)
Salt (2011)
In The Trees Where I Can See (2016)

References

External links
 Official site
 
 Hoots & Hellmouth at Last.fm

American folk musical groups
Musical groups from Philadelphia
Musical groups from Pennsylvania
MAD Dragon Records artists
Independent Music Awards winners